System One, System I or System 1 may refer to:

Computing 
 Acorn System 1, 8-bit microcomputer by Acorn
 Atari System 1, an arcade game hardware platform by Atari
 Cromemco System One, a microcomputer from the early 1980s by Cromemco
 IBM Q System One, a 2019 circuit-based commercial quantum computer by IBM 
 Line Drawing System-1, an early graphical computer
 Sega System 1, the arcade system board
 System 1, the initial operating system version for the Apple Macintosh
 Tulip System-1, 16-bit personal computer by Tulip

Other uses 
System-1 Aira, a synthesizer produced by Roland
 System One, a range of bus passes offered by Transport for Greater Manchester
 System 1, the fast, automatic mode of thinking, as described in Daniel Kahneman's book Thinking, Fast and Slow

See also 
 System I (disambiguation)
 SystmOne, a clinical and administrative software system developed by TPP (The Phoenix Partnership) company.
 Series 1